55 Ursae Majoris (55 UMa) is a triple star system in the constellation Ursa Major. Its apparent magnitude is 4.80. Two stars form a close spectroscopic binary with an orbital period of 2.55 days. The third star orbits the central pair every 1873 days. All three stars are A-type main-sequence stars.

References

Ursa Major (constellation)
A-type main-sequence stars
Spectroscopic binaries
Triple star systems
Ursae Majoris, 55
Durchmusterung objects
098353
055266
4380